Cryptosporangium mongoliense is a Gram-positive, aerobic and non-motile bacterium species from the genus of Cryptosporangium which has been isolated from soil from Mongolia.

References

External links
Type strain of Cryptosporangium mongoliense at BacDive -  the Bacterial Diversity Metadatabase

Actinomycetia
Bacteria described in 2012